The 2009 Judo Grand Prix Abu Dhabi was held in Abu Dhabi, United Arab Emirates from 20 to 21 November 2009.

Medal summary

Men's events

Women's events

Source Results

Medal table

References

External links
 

2009 IJF World Tour
2009 Judo Grand Prix
Judo
Grand Prix Abu Dhabi 2009
Judo
Judo